Ramon Rodrigo de Carvalho (born 19 May 1997), simply known as Ramon, is a Brazilian footballer who plays as a defensive midfielder for Ponte Preta, on loan from Atlético Goianiense.

Club career
Born in Limeira, São Paulo, Ramon started his career with Desportivo Brasil. He made his first team debut on 26 April 2015, playing the last 27 minutes in a 1–0 Campeonato Paulista Segunda Divisão away win against Inter de Bebedouro. He scored his first goal on 30 May, netting the opener through a penalty kick in a 1–1 home draw against Olé Brasil.

In 2016, after a short period on loan at Palmeiras, Ramon joined Internacional also in a temporary deal. Bought outright by the latter club for the 2017 season, he subsequently featured regularly for the B-team.

On 29 March 2019, Ramon was loaned to Série B side Vila Nova until the end of the season. He became a regular starter for the side, contributing with two goals in 40 appearances overall but suffering team relegation.

In November 2019, Ramon renewed his contract with Inter and moved to fellow Série A side Bahia on loan, with a buyout clause. Initially assigned to the under-23 squad for the 2020 Campeonato Baiano, he was definitely promoted to the main squad shortly after, and made his top tier debut on 27 September 2020 by coming on as a late substitute for Ronaldo in a 0–1 away loss against Athletico Paranaense.

On 12 April 2021, Ramon terminated his loan with Bahia and joined fellow top tier side América Mineiro, also in a temporary deal.

Career statistics

Honours
Bahia
Campeonato Baiano: 2020

 Atlético Goianiense
Campeonato Goiano: 2022

References

External links
Bahia profile 

1997 births
Living people
Footballers from São Paulo (state)
Brazilian footballers
Association football midfielders
Campeonato Brasileiro Série A players
Campeonato Brasileiro Série B players
Desportivo Brasil players
Sport Club Internacional players
Vila Nova Futebol Clube players
Esporte Clube Bahia players
América Futebol Clube (MG) players
Atlético Clube Goianiense players